Blondie Hits the Jackpot is a 1949 American comedy film directed by Edward Bernds and starring Penny Singleton, Arthur Lake, Larry Simms, and Marjorie Ann Mutchie. It is the 26th of the 28 Blondie films.

Plot
Dagwood is hired on a construction crew raising a new office building. After stumbling through several careless mishaps and pratfalls while handling construction materials, he overhears a foreman order a workman to patch a badly cracked steel girder rather than replace it. Racing to a pay telephone, Dagwood calls Blondie and asks her to contact the property's owner, who unfortunately has an unlisted phone number. The owner is finally located and races to the site in time to fire the foreman and give Dagwood a major promotion.

Cast
 Penny Singleton as Blondie
 Arthur Lake as Dagwood
 Larry Simms as Baby Dumpling
 Marjorie Ann Mutchie as Cookie
Daisy as Daisy the Dog
 Jerome Cowan as Mr. Radcliffe
 Lloyd Corrigan as J.B. Hutchins
 Ann Carter as Louise Hutchins
 Danny Mummert as Alvin Fuddle
 James Flavin as Brophy

References

External links
 
 
 
 

1949 films
Columbia Pictures films
American black-and-white films
Blondie (film series) films
1949 comedy films
Films directed by Edward Bernds
American comedy films
1940s American films